Scriptoplusia rubiflabellata is a moth of the family Noctuidae. It is found in Goodenough Island, New Guinea and Queensland.

External links
Australian Faunal Directory
Image at CSIRO Entomology

Moths of Australia
Plusiinae
Moths of New Guinea
Moths described in 1921